"In Arcadia Ego" is the eighteenth episode of the second season of the crime-thriller television series Millennium. It premiered on the Fox network on April 3, 1998. The episode was written by Chip Johannessen, and directed by Thomas J. Wright.

In this episode, offender profiler Frank Black (Lance Henriksen) tracks two women who have escaped from prison; they believe that one of them is pregnant with a virginal conception. "In Arcadia Ego" featured guest appearances from Mary-Pat Green and Ed Lauter.

Plot

In a women's prison, inmates and lovers "Sonny" Palmer (Mary-Pat Green) and Janette Viti (Missy Crider) begin an escape attempt by overpowering a guard; when attacking a second guard, Viti is shot. Sonny beats the guard in response, before realizing Viti has survived as the bullet was stopped by a badge on her stolen uniform; the two believe they see a face in the flattened round. Later, offender profiler Frank Black (Lance Henriksen) is called to investigate the breakout by prison warden Kellard (Ed Lauter). Kellard enumerates Sonny's history of violence, having killed both her stepfather and husband, and now a guard. Black is puzzled by her need to escape, however, as her parole date is only a few months away.

Sonny and Viti carjack a motorist, bringing him to a house where they seem disappointed to find no one home. They abandon the car with its owner tied in the back seat, before fleeing to a motel where it is revealed that Viti is heavily pregnant. Meanwhile, Black researches Sonny's history, finding that she seems to lash out defensively rather than aggressively—she killed the stepfather that was abusing her sister, and killed her husband after a history of domestic abuse. He believes her escape was an attempt to protect someone else; a report by the hijacked motorist reveals Viti's pregnancy to the investigators. Black believes one of the prison guards is the father; a guard named Shiffer admits to raping her under sedation in the infirmary.
 
Sonny and Viti visit a clinic for a sonogram, but leave abruptly when they realize the guard they attacked died of his injuries. Black and fellow investigator Peter Watts (Terry O'Quinn) learn that the sonogram revealed a placenta praevia, which could prove fatal during labor. They also conjecture that the couple may try fleeing by rail, as Sonny had previously worked on a railroad. Black tracks them to a boxcar, but is taken hostage by Sonny; Viti has now gone into labor. Black explains that Viti's rapist has confessed, which angers Sonny—she believes the pregnancy is a virgin birth.
  
The police begin to surround the boxcar as Viti's contractions intensify; Sonny demands medical staff be brought in and two police officers instead pose as paramedics. Black warns Sonny to search their medical supplies and to avoid exposing herself to police snipers. Black aids with Viti's delivery, but she dies of blood loss. The child is born white, apparently ruling out the black Shiffer as its father. Reacting to Viti's death, Sonny runs outside and mimes drawing a gun, committing suicide by cop. Black later travels to the house the couple had abandoned the car at, meeting a religious couple who had been praying for Sonny and Viti during their sentences, who agree to adopt the child.

Production

The script for "In Arcadia Ego" was written by Chip Johannessen, who went on to write a total of twelve episodes across all three seasons, including the series' final episode, "Goodbye to All That". The episode was directed by Thomas J. Wright, who helmed a total of twenty-six episodes across all three seasons. Wright would also go on to direct "Millennium", the series' crossover episode with its sister show The X-Files.

Broadcast and reception

"In Arcadia Ego" was first broadcast on the Fox network on April 3, 1998. The episode earned a Nielsen rating of 5.5 during its original broadcast, meaning that  of households in the United States viewed the episode. This represented approximately  households.

"In Arcadia Ego" received mixed reviews from critics. The A.V. Club Zack Handlen rated the episode a "B+". Handlen praised Henriksen's acting in the episode, finding that he had given the character of Frank Black more dramatic weight here and throughout the second season compared to the calmer portrayals of the first season. However, Handlen considered the ending of the episode to be too "neat and tidy", resolving a potentially profound development for the series in quite a perfunctory manner. Robert Shearman and Lars Pearson, in their book Wanting to Believe: A Critical Guide to The X-Files, Millennium & The Lone Gunmen, rated "In Arcadia Ego" one star out of five. Shearman called the episode "uncharacteristically crass" and "simplistic to a fault", finding its characters much too one-dimensional to tell an effective story. Bill Gibron, writing for DVD Talk, rated the episode 3 out of 5, comparing it favorably to the first-season episode "The Wild and the Innocent", which similarly shared themes of parents on the run to safeguard a child. However, Gibron was critical of the episode's focus on "the miracle of birth", finding it uncharacteristic of the series.

Notes

Footnotes

References

External links
 

1998 American television episodes
Millennium (season 2) episodes